Jay Sparrow is a Canadian singer-songwriter and musician.

Life and career

Born in Thunder Bay, Ontario and raised in Edmonton, Alberta, Sparrow was lead singer for the Edmonton punk rock band Murder City Sparrows. However, he eventually decided to dissolve the band and pursue a different musical direction after realizing that he had no punk rock on his iPod, but instead listened mainly to songwriters such as Steve Earle and Bruce Springsteen.

He released his first solo EP, The Running, in 2009, and followed up with two more EPs, Good Days Gone By in 2009 and The Tempest Line in 2010, before releasing his full-length album debut, In Our Time, in the fall of 2010. He was the winning Alberta songwriter in the 2009 edition of CBC Radio 2's Great Canadian Song Quest, for which he wrote and recorded the song "The Ballad of Mary White".

Discography

With Murder City Sparrows
Studio albums
 Dead Horse Disco (2009)

EPs
 Murder City Sparrows (2006)

Solo
Studio albums
 In Our Time (2010)
 White (2012)
 Bluebird (2014)
 Let Wild Dogs Run (2020)

EPs
 The Running (2009)
 Good Days Gone By (2010)
 The Tempest Line (2010)

References

External links
 
 Jay Sparrow on Myspace

Year of birth missing (living people)
Living people
Musicians from Thunder Bay
Writers from Thunder Bay
Canadian rock singers
Canadian male singers
Canadian male singer-songwriters
Canadian singer-songwriters
Musicians from Edmonton
Writers from Edmonton